Zhu Zijun (朱志均, 1403–1426) was a Chinese prince of the Ming dynasty. He was the son of Zhu Shangbing, Prince Yin of Qin, and the elder brother of Zhu Zhigeng, Prince Xi of Qin. In 1403, he was made Prince of Weinan, and in 1424, he was made Prince of Qin.

Zhu Zhijun died in 1426 at the age of 24, and was given the posthumous title of Huai (懷). He didn't have any children because Zhu Zhijun and Lady Zhang weren't married yet. His younger full-brother, Zhu Zhiqie, succeeded him.

References

1404 births
1426 deaths
Ming dynasty imperial princes